Vincent Hugh Jones (born 24 March 1954) is an Australian jazz singer, songwriter, and trumpet, flugelhorn and flumpet player. His music includes both original material and new contemporary versions of jazz standards. His themes are often love, inequity, injustice, peace and anti-greed.

Biography 

Vincent Hugh Jones was born on 24 March 1954 in Paisley, Scotland. He is the second eldest of four children to John Jones and Mary (née Docherty); the family moved to Australia in April 1964 and lived in Wollongong; where Jones attended Corrimal High School. He attributes his love of jazz to hearing Miles Davis's album Sketches of Spain, when he was about 14 and taught himself to play the trumpet. Jones began his career in 1974 in New South Wales as a bebop trumpet player on the club and jazz circuit.

In November 1981 Jones recorded his debut album, Watch What Happens, with John Bye producing at Richmond Recorders in Melbourne. Adrian Jackson of Jazz magazine touted Jones as the "new Melbourne jazz star" in June 1982.

In 1994, he contributed "A Song for You" for Kate Ceberanos 1994 album, Kate Ceberano and Friends.

On 25 May 2011, Vince appeared as a contestant in Episode #7.4 of music quiz show Spicks and Specks.

Discography

Albums

Awards

AIR Awards
The Australian Independent Record Awards (commonly known informally as AIR Awards) is an annual awards night to recognise, promote and celebrate the success of Australia's Independent Music sector.

|-
| AIR Awards of 2017
| Provanance (with Paul Grabowsky)
| Best Independent Jazz Album
| 
|-

APRA Awards
The APRA Awards are held in Australia and New Zealand by the Australasian Performing Right Association to recognise songwriting skills, sales and airplay performance by its members annually. Jones has won three awards from four nominations.

|-
| 1986
| "For All Colours"
| Most Performed Australian Jazz Work
| 
|-
| 1987
| "Blue"
| Most Performed Australian Jazz Work
| 
|-
| 1993
| "Hindered on His Way to Heaven" 
| Jazz Composition of the Year
| 
|-
| 2017
| "Still Night" 
| Jazz Work of the Year
| 
|-

ARIA Music Awards
The ARIA Music Awards is an annual awards ceremony that recognises excellence, innovation, and achievement across all genres of Australian music. It commenced in 1987. Jones has won three awards from nine nominations.

|-
| rowspan="2"| 1987
| rowspan="2"| Tell Me a Secret
| Best Jazz Album
| 
|-
| Best Adult Contemporary Album
| 
|-
| 1988
| It All Ends Up in Tears
| Best Jazz Album
| 
|-
| 1990
| Trustworthy Little Sweethearts
| Best Jazz Album
| 
|-
| rowspan="2"| 1991
| rowspan="2"| Come in Spinner 
| Best Original Soundtrack/Cast/Show Album
| 
|-
| ARIA Award for Best Adult Contemporary Album
| 
|-
| 1993
| Future Girl
| Best Jazz Album
| 
|-
| 2014
| The Monash Sessions
| Best Jazz Album
| 
|-
| 2016
| Provenance 
| Best Jazz Album
| 
|-

Australian Jazz Bell Awards
The Australian Jazz Bell Awards, also known as the Bell Awards or The Bells, are annual music awards for the jazz music genre in Australia. They commenced in 2003. Jones has been nominated twice.

|-
| 2004
| Gold
| Best Australian Jazz Vocal Album
| 
|-
| 2016
| Provenance 
| Best Australian Jazz Vocal Album
| 
|-

Mo Awards
The Australian Entertainment Mo Awards (commonly known informally as the Mo Awards), were annual Australian entertainment industry awards. They recognise achievements in live entertainment in Australia from 1975 to 2016.
 (wins only)
|-
| 1996
| Vince Jones
| Jazz Vocal Performer of the Year
| 
|-

References 

1954 births
Living people
21st-century trumpeters
20th-century Australian male singers
21st-century Australian male singers
APRA Award winners
ARIA Award winners
Australian jazz singers
Australian jazz trumpeters
Male jazz musicians